William D. Gourley (August 17, 1937 – September 2, 2014) was an American football coach and sportscaster.  He served as the head football coach at North Park College—now known as North Park University—in Chicago for three seasons, from 1970 to 1972, compiling a record of 8–17–2.

Gourley began his coaching career at Loyola Academy in Wilmette, Illinois.

Head coaching record

References

1937 births
2014 deaths
North Park Vikings football coaches
Miami University alumni
Sportspeople from Chicago